The boys' 100 metre breaststroke event at the 2018 Summer Youth Olympics took place on 7 and 8 October at the Natatorium in Buenos Aires, Argentina.

Results

Heats
The heats were started on 7 October at 11:00.

Semifinals
The semifinals were started on 7 October at 18:38.

Final
The final was held on 8 October at 19:02.

References

Swimming at the 2018 Summer Youth Olympics